Nová Dubnica ) is a town in Trenčín Region, Slovakia.

Geography
It is located in the Ilava Basin at the foothills of the Strážovské vrchy mountains.

History
The town was established in the 1950s originally for the purpose of housing workers of the local heavy machinery factory Závody ťažkého strojárstva. Therefore, it can be described as a bedroom community. Construction started in 1951, and became separate from Dubnica nad Váhom and from parts of cadastral areas of Trenčianske Teplice and Veľký Kolačin municipalities in 1957 and was named Nová Dubnica and received town rights in 1960. In 1971 municipality of Kolačín made of Malý Kolačín and Velký Kolačín was annexed to the town.

Demographics
According to the 2001 census, the town had 12,358 inhabitants. 95.6% of inhabitants were Slovaks, 1.8% Czechs and 0.2% German and Hungarians. The religious makeup was 70.8% Roman Catholics, 20.7% people with no religious affiliation, and 3.4% Lutherans.

Notable people
 Rastislav Blaško, former vice-chairman of Social Democratic Party of Slovakia, born in Ilava in 1971, lived in Nová Dubnica from 1979 to 1987. He is holder of twice bronze medal for 3rd place as the staff member of Slovak FootGolf National Team at the 2. European Team FootGolf Championship EURO FOOTGOLF 2019 in United Kingdom, England and 2021 in Hungary.
 Júlia Liptáková, Slovak model

Interests
The cinema Panorex, which is used for organizing cultural events, was the first panoramic cinema in Slovakia.

Twin towns — sister cities

Nová Dubnica is twinned with:
 Dubna, Russia
 Miedźna, Poland
 San Daniele del Friuli, Italy
 Slavičín, Czech Republic

References

External links

 Official website
 Magazine about life in Dubnica and Nová Dubnica

Cities and towns in Slovakia
Villages and municipalities in Ilava District